Anthony Okpotu (born 3 March 1994) is a Nigerian professional footballer who plays as a forward for Qatar and the Nigerian national team.

Club career
Born in Makurdi, Okpotu spent his early club football with Lobi Stars and Al-Ittihad Tripoli. In April 2018 he had a trial at Danish club Brøndby. He joined Morocco side Difaâ Hassani El Jadidi in July 2018. On 31 January 2019, Okpotu was loaned out to Albanian club KF Laçi.

On 10 October 2020, he signed for Qatari club Qatar SC.

International career
Okpotu made his international debut for Nigeria in 2018.

Honours
Nigeria Professional Football League Top scorer: 2017 (19 goals)
Tunisian Ligue Professionnelle 1 Top scorer: 2019 (14 goals)

References

1994 births
Living people
Nigerian footballers
Nigeria international footballers
Lobi Stars F.C. players
Al-Ittihad Club (Tripoli) players
Difaâ Hassani El Jadidi players
KF Laçi players
US Monastir (football) players
Qatar SC players
Botola players
Kategoria Superiore players
Libyan Premier League players
Nigeria Professional Football League players
Tunisian Ligue Professionnelle 1 players
Qatar Stars League players
Association football forwards
Nigerian expatriate footballers
Nigerian expatriate sportspeople in Libya
Expatriate footballers in Libya
Nigerian expatriate sportspeople in Morocco
Expatriate footballers in Morocco
Nigerian expatriate sportspeople in Albania
Expatriate footballers in Albania
Nigerian expatriate sportspeople in Tunisia
Expatriate footballers in Tunisia
Nigerian expatriate sportspeople in Qatar
Expatriate footballers in Qatar
Nigeria A' international footballers
2018 African Nations Championship players